Dominican Republic competed at the 2008 Summer Paralympics in Beijing, People's Republic of China. The country's delegation consisted of a single competitor, runner Alfonso Olivero Encarnacion. Olivero Encarnacion participated in one event and did not win a medal.

Athletics

See also
Dominican Republic at the Paralympics
Dominican Republic at the 2008 Summer Olympics

External links
International Paralympic Committee

Nations at the 2008 Summer Paralympics
2008
Summer Paralympics